Arges or Argeș may refer to:

Places and jurisdictions

Romania 
 Argeș County, a county in Muntenia, with its capital at Pitești
 Argeș Region, an administrative division from 1950 to 1952
 Argeș River, which flows through the Southern Carpathians into the Danube at Oltenița
 Curtea de Argeș, a city of Muntenia in the lower Carpathians; it is/was the archepiscopal see of :
 Archdiocese of Argeș and Muscel, a diocese of the Romanian Orthodox Church
 Albeștii de Argeș, a commune in Argeș County
 Poienarii de Argeș, a commune in Argeș County
 Ținutul Argeș, an administrative division from 1938 to 1940

Iran 
 Arges-e Olya, a village in Hamadan Province, Iran
 Arges-e Sofla, a village in Hamadan Province, Iran

Other uses 
 A Kurdish male name
 Arges (Cyclops), also called Acmonides or Pyraemonone, one of the cyclopes in Greek mythology
 Argeș (flamethrower)
 Arges project, a research project in the field of metal-halide lamps
 FC Argeș Pitești, a Romanian Liga I football club
 Constantin Dobrescu-Argeș, Romanian politician

See also
 Argis, a French commune in the Ain department in the Auvergne-Rhône-Alpes region